Rodrigatos de las Regueras is a minor local entity in the municipality of Igüeña, in the Province of León, Spain. As of 2020, it has a population of 9.

Geography 
Rodrigatos de las Regueras is located 96km west-northwest of León, Spain.

References

Populated places in the Province of León